The 1986–87 NBA season was the Cavaliers' 17th season in the NBA.

The season saw the team draft Brad Daugherty and Ron Harper with the first and eighth overall picks, respectively. Future four-time All-Star Mark Price was brought in from Dallas, who drafted him in the second round of the draft.

Draft picks

Roster

Regular season

Season standings

z - clinched division title
y - clinched division title
x - clinched playoff spot

Record vs. opponents

Game log

|-style="background:#fcc;"
| 2 || November 2, 1986 || Chicago
|-style="background:#cfc;"
| 4 || November 7, 1986 || @ Golden State
|-style="background:#fcc;"
| 8 || November 15, 1986 || @ Dallas
|-style="background:#fcc;"
| 9 || November 16, 1986 || @ Houston
|-style="background:#fcc;"
| 10 || November 19, 1986 || Golden State
|-style="background:#fcc;"
| 11 || November 20, 1986 || @ Atlanta
| L 89–108
|
|
|
| The Omni8,547
| 3–8
|-style="background:#fcc;"
| 12 || November 22, 1986 || @ Detroit

|-style="background:#cfc;"
| 16 || December 4, 1986 || Detroit
|-style="background:#cfc;"
| 17 || December 6, 1986 || Boston
|-style="background:#fcc;"
| 18 || December 9, 1986 || Atlanta
| L 98–122
|
|
|
| Coliseum at Richfield10,276
| 8–10
|-style="background:#fcc;"
| 25 || December 23, 1986 || @ Chicago
|-style="background:#cfc;"
| 28 || December 29, 1986 || Atlanta
| W 107–106
|
|
|
| Coliseum at Richfield15,458
| 13–15

|-style="background:#fcc;"
| 32 || January 6, 1987 || Chicago
|-style="background:#fcc;"
| 34 || January 10, 1987 || @ Atlanta
| L 104–129
|
|
|
| The Omni15,649
| 14–20
|-style="background:#fcc;"
| 35 || January 13, 1987 || Detroit
|-style="background:#fcc;"
| 36 || January 14, 1987 || @ Detroit
|-style="background:#fcc;"
| 37 || January 16, 1987 || @ Boston
|-style="background:#fcc;"
| 39 || January 19, 1987 || Houston
|-style="background:#fcc;"
| 41 || January 23, 1987 || @ Chicago
|-style="background:#cfc;"
| 42 || January 24, 1987 || Chicago
|-style="background:#cfc;"
| 44 || January 29, 1987 || Atlanta
| W 102–91
|
|
|
| Coliseum at Richfield10,569
| 17–27

|-style="background:#fcc;"
| 46 || February 4, 1987 || @ Boston
|-style="background:#fcc;"
| 49 || February 12, 1987 || Detroit
|-style="background:#fcc;"
| 54 || February 22, 1987 || Chicago
|-style="background:#fcc;"
| 56 || February 25, 1987 || @ Detroit
|-style="background:#cfc;"
| 57 || February 28, 1987 || @ Denver

|-style="background:#fcc;"
| 67 || March 18, 1987 || Denver
|-style="background:#fcc;"
| 70 || March 24, 1987 || vs. Boston(at Hartford, CT)
|-style="background:#fcc;"
| 72 || March 29, 1987 || Dallas

|-style="background:#fcc;"
| 76 || April 6, 1987 || @ Atlanta
| L 105–110
|
|
|
| The Omni8,459
| 27–49
|-style="background:#cfc;"
| 77 || April 7, 1987

Player statistics

Player Statistics Citation:

Awards and records
 Brad Daugherty, NBA All-Rookie Team 1st Team
 Ron Harper, NBA All-Rookie Team 1st Team
 John "Hot Rod" Williams, NBA All-Rookie Team 1st Team

Transactions

References

Cleveland Cavaliers seasons
Cleveland
Cleveland